Lalrinkimi Varte (born 19 April 1988), better known by her stage name Mami Varte, is a Mizo singer most notable in Northeast India.

Music career
Mami Varte began singing at the age of 12, where she performed in various programs at church and school during her childhood. She released her debut album Damlai Par in 2007.

Varte has worked with Bhupen Hazarika, Sourabhee Debbarma, and Lou Majaw on the song and music video for 'Our North-East, Our Star', as well as for a song directed by Shantanu Moitra.

She has also performed on the show Indian Idol, at the Ink (Innovation and Knowledge) conference in Lavasa, and season 2 of the Indian television series Coke Studio @ MTV.

Recently, she signed with the record label Kings & Prophets Records.

Mizo Idol
Varte became a judge on the 4th Season of the Mizo TV show Mizo Idol and she was also chosen to be the mentor for 'Lengzem' categories.

Discography

References

External links
Mami Varte on Twitter
Mami Varte on Instagram

Living people
People from Aizawl
Indian women pop singers
21st-century Indian singers
1988 births
Indian child singers
Singers from Mizoram
21st-century Indian women singers
Women artists from Mizoram